The 1968 Wales rugby union tour of Argentina was a collection of friendly rugby union games undertaken by the Wales national team to Argentina.

History
The tour also took in five matches against Argentine regional and invitational teams with one test against South Africa. This was the first official Wales tour to the southern hemisphere.

It was the first Welsh tour in Argentina: before only South Africa, Ireland and France national teams, visited Argentina and South America.

Despite the fact that the Welsh Rugby Union didn't considered them as official, the two matches against Argentina national team were official test matches for Argentina.

It was a big surprise that the "Pumas" won the series with a victory and a draw.

Match summary
Complete list of matches played by Wales in Argentina:

 Test matches

Notes

Match details

Belgrano A.C.: H. Rosati; C. Cornille, C. Martínez, G. Escobar, E. de las Carreras; F. Forrester, L. Gradín; A. Gómez Aparicio, E. Elowson, L. Loyola; M. Cole, L. Tahier; G. Luchetti, F. Gradín (cap.), E. 
Verardo. 
Wales: J. Williams; A. Morgan, J. Dawes (cap.), G. Ball, L. Daniel; P. Bennet, G. Turner; T. Gray, D. Highes, D. Morris; L. Baxter, R. Mainwaring; B. Butler, N. Gales, J. Lloyd.  

Seleccionado del Interior: J. Seaton; E. España, R. Taquini, J. Benzi, A. Quetglas; R. Villavicencio, O. Aletta da Silva; J. Imhoff, M. Chesta, J. L. Imhoff (cap.); M. Campra, H. Suárez; F. Landó, J. Fradua, S. Furno. 
Wales: J. Williams; S. Ferguson, G. Ball, G. Dawes (cap.), A. Morgan; R. Phillips, T. Evans, A. John,  J. Jeffery, A. Gray; M. Witshire, W. Mainwaring; W. Williams, B. Rees, L. Butler.  

Argentina: 15.Jorge Seaton, 14.Mario Walther, 13.Arturo Rodriguez Jurado, 12.Marcelo Pascual, 11.Alejandro Travaglini, 10.Jorge Dartiguelongue, 9.Adolfo Etchegaray, 7.Miguel Chesta, 8.Hector Silva, 6.Raul Loyola, 5.Aitor Otano, 4.Adrian Anthony, 3.Marcelo Farina, 2.Ricardo Handley, 1.Luis Garcia Yanez 
Wales: 15.JPR Williams, 14.Laurie Daniel, 13.Glen Ball, 12.John Dawes, 11.Andy Morgan, 10.Phil Bennett, 9.Glyn Turner, 8.Dennis Hughes, 7.Tony Gray, 6.Dai Morris, 5.Billy Mainwaring, 4.Lyn Baxter, 3.Brian Butler, 2.Brian Rees, 1.John Lloyd  

Argentina B: D. Morgan; N. Pérez, J. Benzi, R. Villavicencio, A. Travaglini; C. Martínez, L. Gradín (cap.); G. Plesky, H. Miguens, J. Imhoff; L. Varela, R. Sellarés; R. Casabal, C. Massabó, A. Abella. 
Wales: J. Williams; L. Daniel, S. Dawes (cap.), G. Ball, A. Morgan; R. Phillips, G. Turner; A. Gray, D. Hughes, W. Morris, W. Mainwarling, M. Witshire; W. Williams, N. Gale, D. Lloyd 

Argentina C: Pagano (cap.); N. Pérez, E. Reynolds, P. Grossi, J. Fiordalisi; G. Pimentel, A. 
Gómez Aparicio; J. O ́Reilly, E. Elowson, m. Morgan; R. Castro, J. Ferraiuolo; M. Carluccio, E. 
Toribio, H. Nicola. 
Wales: J. Williams; S. Ferguson, G. Ball, S. Dawes (cap.), A. Morgan; P. Bennet, T. Evans; A. John, D. Hughes, J. Jefrey; M. Wilshire, L. Baxter; w. Williams, B. Rees, B. Butler. 

Argentina: 15.Jorge Seaton, 14.Mario Walther, 13.Arturo Rodriguez Jurado, 12.Marcelo Pascual, 11.Nestor Perez, 10.Jorge Dartiguelongue, 9.Adolfo Etchegaray, 7.Hector Silva cap., 8.Miguel Chesta, 6.Raul Loyola, 5.Aitor Otano, 4.Adrian Anthony, 3.Marcelo Farina, 2.Ricardo Handley, 1.Luis Garcia Yanez
Wales: 15.JPR Williams, 14.Laurie Daniel, 13.Glen Ball, 12.John Dawes cap., 11.Stuart Ferguson, 10.Bob Phillips, 9.Glyn Turner, 8.Dennis Hughes, 7.Tony Gray, 6.Dai Morris, 5.Billy Mainwaring, 4.Max Wiltshire, 3.John Lloyd, 2.Norman Gale, 1.Walter Williams,

See also
 History of rugby union matches between Argentina and Wales

References

1968 rugby union tours
1968
1968
rugby
tour
History of rugby union matches between Argentina and Wales